Saint John's Seminary, located in the Brighton neighborhood of Boston, Massachusetts, is a Catholic major seminary sponsored by the Roman Catholic Archdiocese of Boston.

Founded in 1884, the seminary has 114 seminarians and approximately 60 lay students, mostly from dioceses in New England.

The current rector is Fr. Stephen E. Salocks.

History 
In 1864, wealthy Boston merchant James Stanworth acquired a farm on a hill in Brighton known as the Hildreth estate. Stanworth suffered losses in the Panic of 1873 and his heirs found he owed substantial debts. Archbishop John Joseph Williams purchased the Hildreth estate and construction of the Boston Ecclesiastical Seminary began in 1881 and was completed in 1884. In 1883, the Commonwealth of Massachusetts granted a Charter to the Seminary to grant degrees in philosophy and divinity. The Archbishop entrusted the seminary to his former teachers, the Sulpicians. Students began classes on September 22, 1884.  The First rector was John Baptist Hogan.

The Seminary was incorporated under the laws of Massachusetts in 1892.  In 1911, the Sulpicians withdrew from the seminary at the request of Archbishop William Henry O'Connell, who preferred a diocesan faculty more familiar with local conditions.

Saint John's Seminary adopted its present name in 1941.

Merger with Cardinal O'Connell Seminary
Cardinal O'Connell Seminary, the archdiocesan minor seminary for high school students in Jamaica Plain, Massachusetts, was merged with Saint John's Seminary in 1968. In 1970 its programs were relocated to a Foster Street site in Saint Clement's Hall.

Crisis and recovery after 2000 child sexual abuse scandal
In the wake of the Catholic Archdiocese of Boston sex abuse scandal enrollment declined from a peak of 86 students in the academic year 2001–02 to 34 for 2005-06. Two years later, the seminary recovered to a student population of 63.

During the 2000s, nearly all the Seminary's land and buildings were sold to Boston College (BC), the neighboring Jesuit-run college.  In 2001, Boston College leased St. Clement's Hall, formerly the site of the Seminary's undergraduate division, and it bought the property in June 2004.  In May 2007, the Archdiocese sold the Seminary's open land, its library building and several other structures.  Rector John Farren, OP resigned and protested the 2007 sale in a letter to Cardinal O'Malley.

After the land sales, the campus of the Seminary consists only of Saint John's Hall.

Sexual misconduct scandal and resignations

In August 2018, the rector of Saint John's was placed on administrative leave after two former seminarians claimed on social media that sexual misconduct occurred at the school. The new allegations forced a new investigation by Archdiocese of Boston against Saint John's. On November 22, 2019, the Archdiocese of Boston and former U.S. Attorney Donald Stern concluded that there was some accuracy to the 2018 allegations, such as the expulsion of two students in 2014 for inappropriate sexual conduct, an incident from 2015 where six students received anonymous sexual text messages, and excessive drinking at a 2015 bachelor party which was held on campus. Despite also criticizing Saint John's for having poor leadership, poor financial oversight, and inadequate human formation of seminarians, the joint investigation also concluded that the sexual misconduct which occurred at the seminary was not unlawful. In December 2019, Stephen Salocks, who was named interim rector when the investigation started, replaced Msgr. James Moroney as the Rector of Saint John's Seminary. In addition to promoting Salocks, Boston Archbishop Cardinal Sean Patrick O'Malley also named Fr. Thomas Macdonald as the new Vice Rector.

Enrollment statistics

Participating dioceses
Most students are from dioceses in New England: in Massachusetts, from the Archdiocese of Boston and the Dioceses of Fall River, Springfield, and Worcester; in Connecticut, from the Archdiocese of Hartford; and also from the dioceses of Burlington, Vermont, Manchester, New Hampshire, and Providence, Rhode Island.

In the academic year of 2014-2015, Saint John's began receiving seminarians from the Diocese of Rochester, New York.  That same year, the Diocese of Portland, which encompasses all of Maine, resumed sending seminarians.  Saint John's also serves as the seminary for a few men from dioceses outside the U.S.

College-level seminary candidates for the Archdiocese of Boston reside at Our Lady of Providence Seminary College in Providence, Rhode Island and various other institutions.

Academics

Seminary programs
As a major seminary, an institution providing formation for the Catholic priesthood, Saint John's offers a four-year program leading to the Master of Divinity degree.  There is also a program leading to the Master of Arts in Theology.

In addition, "Saint John's Seminary offers a two-year program of initial formation for those candidates who are college graduates and have no prior experience of formal preparation for the sacrament of Holy Orders."  Those who complete the Pre-Theology Program may qualify to receive a Bachelor of Philosophy (B.Phil.).

Programs for lay students
The Seminary's Theological Institute for the New Evangelization offers programs for lay people wishing to work in Roman Catholic ministry, leading to the degrees Master of Theological Studies for the New Evangelization, and Master of Arts in Ministry (MAM).  These programs are based at a separate campus in accordance with norms of the Holy See.  The MAM division of TINE also offers non-credit catechist training programs in evangelization and apologetics.

Accreditation
The Seminary is accredited by the Association of Theological Schools and by the New England Association of Schools and Colleges.

Athletics
Seminarians partake in sports including basketball, football, golf, softball, and soccer, including intramural games with BC club teams.  Twice a year St. John's Seminary competes in softball games against Pope St. John XXIII National Seminary (Weston, MA) and Our Lady of Providence College Seminary (Providence, RI).  With access to the Margot Connell Recreation Center at Boston College, seminarians contend in intramural basketball and soccer leagues against Boston College students.

Daily life
The daily schedule includes classes and services in chapel.  Seminarians have off-campus pastoral assignments at least once per week.  Most seminarians also have a "house job", such as sacristan or bookstore manager.  Each seminarian meets with his spiritual director twice monthly.

Notable alumni
 Robert Joseph Banks, bishop of Green Bay 1985–2003
 Hugh F. Blunt (1877–1957), priest and poet
 George William Coleman, bishop of Fall River since 2003
 Daniel Anthony Cronin, archbishop of Hartford 1992–2003
 Richard Cushing, archbishop of Boston 1944–1970
 John Michael D'Arcy, bishop of Fort Wayne-South Bend 1985–2009
 Jonathan DeFelice, OSB, president of Saint Anselm College
 Daniel Francis Desmond, bishop of Alexandria (Louisiana) 1933–1945
 George Albert Guertin, bishop of Manchester 1907–1931
 Daniel Anthony Hart, bishop of Norwich 1995–2003
 William A. Hickey, bishop of Providence 1921–1933
 Alfred Clifton Hughes, bishop of Baton Rouge 1993–2002 and archbishop of New Orleans 2002–2009
 Frederick Kriekenbeek, exorcist and priest in Cebu
 Richard Lennon, bishop of Cleveland since 2006
 Joseph Francis Maguire, bishop of Springfield 1977–1991
 Richard Joseph Malone, bishop of Portland 2004–2012 and bishop of Buffalo 2012–2019
 John Brendan McCormack, bishop of Manchester 1998–2010
 John P. McDonough, Chief of Chaplains of the U.S. Air Force
 Henry J. Meade, Chief of Chaplains of the U.S. Air Force
 Roger Morin, bishop of Biloxi since 2009
 John Bertram Peterson, professor, bishop of Manchester 1932–1944
 Joseph John Rice, bishop of Burlington, 1910–1938
 Nicholas Samra, Melkite Greek Catholic bishop of Newton, appointed 2011
 William Laurence Sullivan (1872–1935), Unitarian minister
 Henry A. Walsh, member of the first class from St. John's
 James Anthony Walsh (1867–1936), co-founder of the Maryknoll Fathers and Brothers
 John Joseph Wright, professor, first bishop of Worcester 1950–1959, bishop of Pittsburgh 1959–1969, cardinal 
 Major General Paul K. Hurley 24th US Army Chief of Chaplains

Notable faculty
 Romanus Cessario, O.P., Master of Sacred Theology of the Dominican Order, professor of systematic theology and member of the Pontifical Academy of St. Thomas Aquinas.
 Christopher J. Coyne, Bishop of Burlington, VT
 James Patrick Moroney, rector, professor of liturgy and executive secretary of the Vox Clara commission
 Louis Sebastian Walsh, Bishop of Portland (Maine), 1906-1924
Michael C. Barber, S.J., Bishop of Oakland, California, Director Emeritus-Spiritual Formation
Mark O'Connell, J.C.D. '90, Auxiliary Bishop of Boston, Judicial Vicar and Professor of Canon Law

Rectors
Under Sulpician administration:
 1884–89: John Baptist Hogan, S.S.
 1889–94: Charles B. Rex
 1894–01: John Baptist Hogan, S.S.
 1901–06: Daniel E. Maher, S.S.
 1906–11: Francis P. Havey

Under archdiocesan administration:
 1911–26: John Bertram Peterson
 1926–33: Charles A. Finn 
 1933–38: Joseph C. Walsh
 1938–50: Edward G. Murray
 1950–58: Thomas J. Riley
 1958–65: Matthew J. Stapleton
 1966–66: Lawrence J. Riley
 1966–71: John A. Broderick
 1972–81: Robert Joseph Banks
 1981–86: Alfred Clifton Hughes
 1986–91: Thomas J. Daly
 1991–99: Timothy J. Moran
 1999–2002: Richard G. Lennon
 2002–07: John A. Farren, OP
 2007–12: Arthur L. Kennedy
 2012–18: James P. Moroney
 2018–2019: Stephen E. Salocks (Interim)
 2019–Present: Stephen E. Salocks

References

External links 
 

Brighton, Boston
Catholic seminaries in the United States
Educational institutions established in 1884
Roman Catholic Archdiocese of Boston
Universities and colleges in Boston
1884 establishments in Massachusetts